Así o de otra manera  (English (roughly):  One Way or Another) is a 1964 Argentine drama film directed and written by David José Kohon based on a story by Carlos Latorre.

Cast
 Mario Passano
 Beatriz Barbieri
 Zulema Katz
 Mecha López
 Maurice Jouvet
 Alberto Barcel
 Raúl del Valle
 Ignacio Souto
 José María Fra

External links
 

Argentine drama films
1964 films
1960s Spanish-language films
1964 drama films
Films directed by David José Kohon
1960s Argentine films